Dennis Lane (1881 – August 10, 1942) was an American labor union leader.

Born in Chicago, Lane worked in the stockyards from an early age.  He joined the Amalgamated Meat Cutters and Butcher Workmen of North America's Local 87, for cattle butchers.  He took part in the major strike of 1904, as a result of which, he was sacked and blacklisted.  He found work in other occupations for a few years, before coming to work as full-time organizer for the Meat Cutters.

In 1914, Lane was elected as vice-president of the Amalgamated Meat Cutters, and then in 1917, to the top position of secretary-treasurer.  He led major organizing drives, which were successful during World War I, but foundered during the post-war depression.  He led the union in a major strike in 1921, which was largely a failure.  However, Lane remained in post, focusing on stabilizing the union, and promoting industrial unionism.  Despite this position, he did not seek to affiliate the Meat Cutters to the Congress of Industrial Organizations, instead remaining loyal to the American Federation of Labor.

Lane died in 1942, still in office.

References

1881 births
1942 deaths
American trade union leaders
People from Chicago
Trade unionists from Illinois